Erica × darleyensis (Darley Dale heath), is a plant hybrid between the heathers E. carnea and E. erigena, probably of garden origin. Unlike some plants in this genus, it has no particular requirement for acid soil but does require sharp drainage in full sun. It is especially suitable as groundcover, for instance as an underplanting for conifers.

The seedling was found in a nursery in Darley Dale, Derbyshire, UK, prior to 1900.

It has given rise to a large number of cultivars, and the following have gained the Royal Horticultural Society’s Award of Garden Merit:- 
E. × darleyensis ‘Arthur Johnson’ 
E. × darleyensis ‘Furzey’ 
E. × darleyensis ‘Ghost Hills’ 
E. × darleyensis ‘J.W. Porter’ 
E. × darleyensis ‘Jenny Porter’ 
E. × darleyensis ‘Kramer’s Rote’ 
E. × darleyensis f. albiflora ‘White Perfection’

References

Ericaceae
Hybrid plants